Tibor Gécsek (born 22 September 1964 in Szentgotthárd) is a retired male hammer thrower from Hungary. Gécsek is of Hungarian Slovenian descent.

He won two consecutive World Championships bronze medals in 1993 and 1995. Later that year he received a four-year ban by the IAAF for a positive drugs test. The next year, however, IAAF shortened the maximum ban to two years. Gécsek was therefore reinstated after two years. His personal best throw was 81.68 metres, achieved in September 1988 in Szombathely, until he threw 82.87 metres to win the 1998 European Championships. This achievement earned him the title 1998 Hungarian Sportsman of the Year. Later that year he threw 83.68 metres in Zalaegerszeg to record his ultimate career best.

Gécsek was elected Vice President of the Hungarian Athletic Federation on 10 November 2002.

International competitions

Awards
 Hungarian Athlete of the Year (5): 1988, 1992, 1993, 1998, 2000

See also
 List of doping cases in athletics

References
 
 
 

1964 births
Living people
People from Szentgotthárd
Hungarian male hammer throwers
Olympic male hammer throwers
Olympic athletes of Hungary
Athletes (track and field) at the 1988 Summer Olympics
Athletes (track and field) at the 1992 Summer Olympics
Athletes (track and field) at the 2000 Summer Olympics
World Athletics Championships athletes for Hungary
World Athletics Championships medalists
European Athletics Championships medalists
Japan Championships in Athletics winners
Hungarian Athletics Championships winners
Hungarian sportspeople in doping cases
Doping cases in athletics
Hungarian Slovenes
Sportspeople from Vas County